Promax may refer to:

ProMax, a chemical process simulator
Promax Awards, in advertising
Promax rotation, a method used in factor analysis
Pro Max, a series of large form factor iPhone devices introduced in 2019